This is a summary of the Estonia national football team results in 2013.

Results in 2013 

Source: Estonian Football Association

Players in 2013

Goalscorers 
As of 19 November 2013.

Starting 11 
As of 19 November 2013.

Debutants 
The following players made their debut for the national team in 2013, national team appearance number and club at the time of debut in brackets:

 Rimo Hunt (#235, Levadia) – against Belarus on 3 June 2013
 Artjom Artjunin (#236, Levadia) – against Azerbaijan on 15 November 2013
 Karol Mets (#237, Flora) – against Liechtenstein on 19 November 2013

References

External links 
 All matches of the Estonia national football team

2013 national football team results
National
2013